A list of films produced in Italy in 1969 (see 1969 in film):

References

Footnotes

Sources

External links
Italian films of 1969 at the Internet Movie Database

1969
Films
Lists of 1969 films by country or language